Lasionycta promulsa is a moth of the family Noctuidae. It occurs from Rampart House in northern Yukon to south-western British Columbia in the west and southern New Mexico in the Rocky Mountains.

It is most common near timberline and is nocturnal. The northern Yukon populations are found in sage grassland, although those on Montana Mountain in southwest Yukon occur in rocky alpine tundra like other populations to the south.

Adults are on wing from mid-July through August.

External links
A Revision of Lasionycta Aurivillius (Lepidoptera, Noctuidae) for North America and notes on Eurasian species, with descriptions of 17 new species, 6 new subspecies, a new genus, and two new species of Tricholita Grote

Lasionycta
Moths of North America
Moths described in 1875